The Northeast Paintball Series (NEPS) was one of two major paintball tournament series in the New England Area. The league was for 5-man Division 4/Novice & Division 5/Rookie level play. The league was run out of Fox4 Paintball in Upton, MA. It was a feeder league for the New England X-Ball league, Foxball.

History

The NEPS was created in 2007 as the Fox4 Tournament series. The name was changed in 2009 to Northeast Regional Series and started crowning series champions. The series has five events a year with the top 4 teams placing and receiving trophies as well as cash prizes. The season usually starts in April and ends in October.  The series has two divisions: Division 5 or rookie for brand new players with little to no tournament experience and Division 4 or rookie with one to two years tournament experience. The NERS switched to the APPA ranking system in 2010. The series is refereed by 187 crew from the Pro PSP team, D1 Champions 2012, and 2010 Division 2 PSP World Cup Champions and 2009 AXBL runners-up, as well as winning/podium performance in the D1/D2 NPPL long ago.

General regulations

The NERS rules are based on the PSP rules  with slight modifications. Inflatable bunkers of differing shapes and sizes are placed on the field in mirrored symmetry. Each end of the field has a start/dead box where the team starts the game and returns to if/or when they are eliminated. Each team consists of five players. The flag is placed in the center of the field and must be hung to end the game. There is a five-minute time limit for the game.

At the beginning of a match, the head referee raises his hand and announces the start of the silent ten-second countdown. At the end of the silent countdown, the game is commenced with the head referee yelling "Go, go, go!" When the game commences, a seven-minute countdown is started. The game ends when either all the players on both teams are eliminated, time runs out, or a flag is hung. Points are awarded for hanging the opposing team's flag on your start station, pulling the opponent's flag from their start station, eliminating opposing players, and for live (unmarked) players at the end of a match.

A player is eliminated when they are hit by a paintball that breaks on any part of the body or equipment or runs out of bounds or is pulled for a penalty against another teammate.  Upon elimination the player must place their gun behind their start station and go to their team's deadbox, located in the back corner of the field. If a player fails to acknowledge a hit, they run the risk of being penalized with a "one-for-one." This penalty consists of a referee pulling out the eliminated player and the closest friendly player.

Series Champions

Novice Results

Rookie Results

 Notorious played with a player that was on their roster as staff. The vacated 180 points would have placed them in 5th place for the season with Nitro Factory moving up to fourth. Event two ballistix and Event three P Bombers placed 5th and would have moved into a placing position.

References 

Paintball
Paintball leagues